Shobha Gyawali is a Nepalese politician, belonging to the CPN (UML) Party. She is currently serving as the member of the 2nd Federal Parliament of Nepal. In the 2022 Nepalese general election she was elected as a proportional representative from the Khas people category.

References

Living people
Nepal MPs 2022–present
Year of birth missing (living people)